ProDG is a regionalist, Christian-democratic political party active in the German-speaking Community of Belgium. The party brings together politicians from the previous Party of German-speaking Belgians (PDB) and PJU parties. The party was formed in 2008 and first featured on the electoral ballot in 2009. Following the 2009 regional election, the party won four out of 25 seats in the Parliament and participated in the regional Government of the German-speaking Community of Belgium with two ministers. In the 2014 regional election, the party won six seats and its leader Oliver Paasch became the new minister-president.

The party was formerly a member of the European Free Alliance.

Election results

German-speaking Community Parliament

European Parliament
Results for the German-speaking electoral college.

References

External links
Official home page (in German)

Centrist parties in Belgium
Christian democratic parties in Belgium
Political parties established in 2008
Politics of Europe
Political parties in the German-speaking Community of Belgium
Regionalist parties
2008 establishments in Belgium